Elachistocleis is a genus of microhylid frogs found in southern America from Panama southwards. Their common name is oval frogs, although for historic reasons not all species are named so.

Taxonomy 
A 2021 study found that the genus originated in the Andes during the Oligocene, and contains two distinct clades that diverged from one another during the Middle Miocene. They dispersed throughout South America following the drying-out of the Pebas mega-wetland system, aided by the Amazon basin and other hydrological systems.

Recent taxonomic evidence indicates that the type species, E. ovalis, is a nomen nudum, as it has no holotype, type locality, and its description lacks detail. The name has been applied to many Elachistocleis populations across South America, which are all now considered to represent undescribed species (with one of these from Trinidad and northern Venezuela being described as E. nigrogularis in 2021). In addition, another Elachistocleis identified from Trinidad in a 1980 study likely represents another undescribed species.

Species
The following species are recognised in the genus Elachistocleis:

References 

 
Microhylidae
Amphibians of Central America
Amphibians of South America
Amphibian genera
Taxa named by Hampton Wildman Parker